Excitebike: World Rally, known as  in Japan and Excitebike: World Challenge in the PAL region, is a racing game released as a WiiWare title for the Wii game console. It is the fifth and most recent title in the Excite racing series, and is the first since the original Excitebike to feature classic 2D racing. The game was developed by Monster Games, and is their third developed game in the series. The title was announced on October 27, 2009 through the NOA edition of the Nintendo Channel, via an episode of Nintendo Week, and was released shortly after in North America on November 9, in Japan on February 2, 2010 and in the PAL region on February 5.

World Rally borrows the same concept as the racing title released for the NES in 1984. The game's core design is that of a time trial arcade racer; that is, each race sees players attempting to get to the finish line in the shortest period of time possible. In contrast to that NES game, the game includes an online multiplayer mode, allowing players to play anonymously over the internet, or with friends in a similar fashion to Mario Kart Wii. The game received mixed to positive reviews from critics.

Gameplay 
 World Rally follows a similar premise as the original Nintendo Entertainment System title released in 1985. The game's core design is that of a time trial arcade racer, that is, each race sees players attempting to get to the finish line in the shortest period of time possible. The player's bike has two options, an accelerator and a turbo function, the latter increases the player's engine temperature and overheating will cause the player's bike to stall. As in Excite Truck and Excitebots, the game features ranks players by S, A, B, C, and D grades which are determined by how well the player performs in races. Only gaining a rating of B or higher will allow the player to progress to the next stage. Getting an S rank will unlock a new bike color. Races take place throughout different fictional tracks around the world, and include locales from London, America, Japan and Mexico.

World Rally includes an online component, allowing players to play anonymously over the internet, or with friends in a similar fashion to Mario Kart Wii. Depending on which place they finish, they receive points. If the players get a certain number of points, a new bike design is unlocked. Much like the original title, Excitebike: World Rally has a level editor, allowing players to create tracks and share them over the internet. Unlike the original title, there is no option to race alone.

Development 
World Rally was  developed by Monster Games and announced on October 27, 2009 through the NOA edition of the Nintendo Channel, via an episode of Nintendo Week. In an interview on 1UP's Retro Gaming Blog, the developers of the game "wanted to approach this project with a clean slate and take advantage of the new abilities of the Wii: the 3-D graphics, the motion controls and the availability of Wi-Fi play" and "be able to enhance the game play in ways that were not possible with the original hardware".

Reception 

World Rally received mixed to positive reviews; the game holds a score of 72% on GameRankings and a score of 70/100 on Metacritic. In his review on IGN, Craig Harris gave the game a 7.9/10 and called it "one of the better WiiWare offerings available". Christian Donlan of Eurogamer gave the game a 7/10 and said: "That's pretty much applicable to the wider experience, really. Like Nintendo's original, ExciteBike: World Rally is simple fun. This is no Trials HD, but it's still great to play as a chummy pass-the-controller game, and nice to have stuck on an SD card for a rainy Sunday afternoon when there are no Columbo reruns to watch on television. Nostalgic, colorful and modest, this is retro-gaming at its least self-conscious". Ryan Scott of GameSpy, however, gave the game 2 stars, and said that the game was fun for a few minutes; Ryan called the game "an unremarkable remake of a game that didn't age too well" and added "nothing's truly new or captivating here. It feels like a half-hearted cash-in designed to prey on our nostalgia, not unlike Teenage Mutant Ninja Turtles: Turtles in Time Re-Shelled. It's nothing but a curiosity, fun for the few minutes prior to the realization of just how badly Excitebike has aged".

Notes

References

External links 
 

2009 video games
Motorcycle video games
Nintendo games
Nintendo Wi-Fi Connection games
Racing video games
Video games developed in the United States
Wii-only games
WiiWare games
Multiplayer and single-player video games
Video games produced by Kensuke Tanabe
Monster Games games